The 2016–17 SK Rapid Wien season was the 119th season in club history.

Background

Background information

Rapid Wien finished the 2015–16 season in second place. Therefore, Rapid Wien started in the 3rd qualifying round of the 2016/17 Europa League competition.

This was the first season Rapid played in the Allianz Stadion.

On 7 November 2016, after a 0-1 defeat at home against Wolfsberger AC both manager Mike Büskens and Director of Football Andreas Müller were sacked. Four days later Damir Canadi was presented as the new manager, joining Rapid from league rival SCR Altach. On 11 December, Fredy Bickel was presented as the new Director of Football.

On 9 April 2017, after a 0-3 defeat in Ried manager Damir Canadi was sacked and replaced by his former assistant coaches Goran Djuricin and Martin Bernhard until end of season. Djuricin was later appointed as manager for the following season.

Pre-season and friendlies

Bundesliga

Bundesliga fixtures and results

League table

Results summary

Austrian Cup

Austrian Cup review
In a curious turn of events, Rapid played all of its first three games in the Austrian Cup in the Sportklub Stadium in Vienna as neither the home grounds of the opponents had the infrastructure to host the game and the venue of the Linzer Stadion, where Blau-Weiß Linz initially wanted to move, was already occupied at the time with hosting the 2016 World Karate Championships.

Austrian Cup fixtures and results

Europa League

Europa League review
Rapid entered the Europa League in the 3rd qualifying round and qualified for the group stage after knocking out Torpedo Zhodino and AS Trenčín. Rapid was drawn into group F to compete against Athletic Bilbao, K.R.C. Genk and US Sassuolo Calcio and did not qualify for the knockout stage.

Qualifying rounds

Group stage

Table

Fixtures and results

Team record

Squad

Squad statistics

Goal scorers

Disciplinary record

Transfers

In

Out

References

Rapid Wien
SK Rapid Wien seasons
Rapid Wien